Sim Jae-yeong (born 24 March 1968) is a South Korean gymnast. She competed in five events at the 1984 Summer Olympics.

References

External links
 

1968 births
Living people
South Korean female artistic gymnasts
Olympic gymnasts of South Korea
Gymnasts at the 1984 Summer Olympics
Place of birth missing (living people)
Asian Games medalists in gymnastics
Gymnasts at the 1986 Asian Games
Asian Games silver medalists for South Korea
Asian Games bronze medalists for South Korea
Medalists at the 1986 Asian Games
20th-century South Korean women